Eddie Tagoe is a Ghanaian actor and reflexologist, probably best-known for his film career in the late 1970s and 1980s.

Early life 
The son of Ghanaian Chieftain Asafoatshe Ayah Tagoe, Eddie Tagoe travelled to London to study reflexology prior to pursuing acting. He then received a grant from the government of Ghana to study at the Royal Academy of Dramatic Art in London.

Acting 
Tagoe is perhaps best-remembered for minor supporting roles in two film classics: As the hippie "Presuming Ed" in the 1987 film production of Withnail and I, a role that he resumed in 2000 in a stage production of the same work; and as one of the pirates in the 1981 hit movie Raiders of the Lost Ark. Billed only as the "Messenger Pirate", his character was sent to find Indiana Jones in advance of Nazis boarding the ship on which Jones was travelling. Initially unable to find Jones, he was instructed by the captain to look again, and immediately replied, "I found him!", pointing to Jones swimming to the Nazi submarine.

Tagoe had a significantly larger part in his film debut, Who Is Killing the Great Chefs of Europe? (1978), and as "Chocolate Mousse" in the 1984 farce, Top Secret!. He appeared in various other roles such as Sgt. Gwambe in Baby: Secret of the Lost Legend (1985), as well as The Dogs of War (1980), Pink Floyd The Wall (1982) and Spaghetti House (1982). Tagoe also appeared in episodes of a number of British television series, including Legacy of Murder, Prospects, and The Bill, becoming "a well-known face on British television as an actor".

Reflexology 
In 1995, he returned to his reflexology career when he was recruited to serve as team reflexologist for Newcastle United F.C.

Filmography

References

External links

Living people
Year of birth missing (living people)
Ghanaian male film actors
Ghanaian emigrants to England
People in alternative medicine
20th-century Ghanaian male actors
Place of birth missing (living people)